Ilia Romanovich Spiridonov (born 5 February 1998) is a Russian pair skater. With former partner Amina Atakhanova, he is the 2015–16 JGP Final bronze medalist.

Career

Early years
Spiridonov began skating in 2002. He and Amina Atakhanova began competing together in December 2014, coached by Natalia Pavlova and Alexander Zaitsev in Moscow.

2015–2016 season 
Atakhanova/Spiridonov's international debut came in September 2015, at the 2015 Junior Grand Prix (JGP) competition in Linz, Austria. Ranked first in both segments, the pair won gold by a margin of 3.79 points over the Czech Republic's Anna Dušková / Martin Bidař. At their second JGP assignment, in Toruń, Poland, they were awarded the silver medal behind Ekaterina Borisova / Dmitry Sopot of Russia. These results qualified Atakhanova/Spiridonov for the 2015–16 JGP Final in Barcelona, Spain, where they won the bronze medal behind Borisova/Sopot and Dušková/Bidař.

At the 2016 Russian Junior Championships, Atakhanova/Spiridonov won the silver medal behind Anastasia Mishina / Vladislav Mirzoev. They were selected to compete at the 2016 World Junior Championships, in Debrecen, Hungary, but withdrew before the start of the competition due to an injury to Atakhanova.

2016–2017 season 
During the 2016 JGP series, Atakhanova/Spiridonov won silver in the Czech Republic and placed fourth in Estonia. Finishing fourth in the JGP rankings, they qualified to the JGP Final in Marseille, France, where they would place sixth. Ranked 8th in the short and first in the free, they finished fourth overall at the 2017 World Junior Championships in Taipei, Taiwan. They received a small gold medal for their free skate.

Pavlova and Zaitsev coached Atakhanova/Spiridonov in Moscow. The skaters ended their partnership following the season.

Partnership with Kudriavtseva 
Spiridonov teamed up with Lina Kudriavtseva in 2017. They made their competitive debut in November 2017, at a Russian Cup event. They were coached by Natalia Pavlova before switching to Nodari Maisuradze and Artur Dmitriev. At their first international event, the 2018 CS Ondrej Nepela Trophy, they took the bronze medal.

Records and achievements
 Set the junior-level pairs' record for the short program to 64.79 points at the 2016–17 ISU Junior Grand Prix competition in Tallinn, Estonia.

Programs

With Kudriavtseva

With Atakhanova

Competitive highlights 
CS: Challenger Series; JGP: Junior Grand Prix

With Kudriavtseva

With Atakhanova

Detailed results 

Small medals for short and free programs awarded only at ISU Championships.

With Kudriavtseva

With Atakhanova

References

External links 

 
 

1998 births
Russian male pair skaters
Living people
Sportspeople from Kazan